Henri Brasseur (29 October 1906 – 10 March 2001) was a Belgian fencer. He competed at the 1928 and 1936 Summer Olympics. In 2001, his body was laid to rest in the Belgian city of Ghent.

References

External links
 

1906 births
2001 deaths
Belgian male fencers
Belgian sabre fencers
Olympic fencers of Belgium
Fencers at the 1928 Summer Olympics
Fencers at the 1936 Summer Olympics